

Taos Inn is an historic inn located in Taos, New Mexico. It is made up of several adobe houses dating from the 19th century, one of which was a home of Thomas "Doc" Martin which hosted the formative meeting of the Taos Society of Artists in 1915. After Doc's death, his widow Helen Martin converted the houses into a hotel, which opened on June 7, 1936 as Hotel Martin. The name was changed to "Taos Inn" by subsequent owners.

It was added to the New Mexico State Register of Cultural Properties in 1981 and to the National Register of Historic Places in 1982.

The Taos Inn was acquired by Imprint Hospitality group in January 2019.

Doc Martin's restaurant
Taos Inn is home to Doc Martin's, a restaurant located in the former offices of Doc Martin.  Doc Martin's has won 29 annual Wine Spectator "Awards of Excellence".

Doc Martin's is famous for its Chile Rellenos and Award Winning Green Chile.

See also

 National Register of Historic Places listings in Taos County, New Mexico

Notes

References
 Frastaci, Mona. "Taos Inn: History Speaks for Itself" in Taos Horse Fly, December 19, 2009.
 Moulton, Cathy. "Historic Taos Inn" in True West Magazine, April 1, 2008.

Further reading
 Weigle, Marta; White, Peter. The Lore of New Mexico. University of New Mexico Press, 2003.

External links

 

Adobe buildings and structures in New Mexico
Buildings and structures in Taos, New Mexico
Hotel buildings on the National Register of Historic Places in New Mexico
History of Taos, New Mexico
Hotels established in 1936
Hotels in New Mexico
New Mexico State Register of Cultural Properties
Tourist attractions in Taos, New Mexico
National Register of Historic Places in Taos County, New Mexico
Pueblo Revival architecture in Taos, New Mexico